Police vehicles in Hong Kong are vehicles of the Hong Kong Police Force, vehicles differ considerably depending on the duties of the departments that the vehicle is assigned to. One of the most commonly seen police vehicles in Hong Kong is the Mercedes-Benz Sprinter police van, which is mostly used by district stations and the Emergency Unit, one of the roles expected of it is rapid response to 999 emergency calls with regards to road safety and public safety.

Current vehicles
Most police vehicles in Hong Kong follow the British "jam sandwich" livery and are white, with a blue and red 3M retroreflective stripe around on the sides of the vehicle with wording "警POLICE察" in white, the only exception being the armoured personnel carriers specially designed for the Police Tactical Unit, which are wholly dark blue and with wording "警POLICE察" on a light blue background in white on the sides of the vehicle. During British rule and up until the 1980s Hong Kong Police vehicles were painted dark navy blue, which is only retained by tactical APC today. Most police vehicles in Hong Kong are equipped with both red and blue emergency vehicle lighting. The vehicles which are allocated at the Hong Kong International Airport having an additional yellow emergency vehicle lighting and yellow roof top. All police vehicle are government property and therefore, have a licence plate which starts with "AM".

Since 2008, the Hong Kong Police Force have brought in the use of Battenburg markings for new police vehicles of the regional traffic branches. In addition, these new vehicles show the force crest on the front part of the vehicle, which the force has not used in the design of new vehicles for the last two decades.

Unmarked vehicles
The Hong Kong Police Force have unmarked police vehicles in order to catch and arrest criminals in the act, such vehicles include the discreet high performance BMW 5 Series 535i Touring car, Infiniti Q70S and the unexpected Toyota Camry (XV 70) 2.5 .  Also, the force operate unmarked police vehicles for surveillance to gather evidence of any criminal offence. In addition, for security purposes, armoured cars specially designed for the Very Important Person Protection Unit and bulletproof tactical police vehicles specially designed for the Special Duties Unit have no markings also.

This is a list of current vehicles (incomplete):

Audi A6 3.0T Avant - patrol car
Brammo Enertia Plus LE - electric motorcycle (10 ordered for trials)
BMW R900RT - motorcycle
BMW 5 series - car
BMW 5 series Touring 535i - car
Ford Crown Victoria Police Interceptor - car (proposed fleet addition)
Ford Mondeo - car
Ford Super Duty -  Armoured Personnel Carrier based on Ford F-550 by China
Ford Econovan MAXI - van
GKN Saxon AT105 - tactical APC
Honda CB250P - motorcycle
Honda CB350P - motorcycle
Honda VFR800P - motorcycle
Honda Stepwgn - car
Hyundai Atos - car
Hyundai Sonata - car
Hyundai Trajet - MPV
Infiniti Q70S 3.7 - unmarked car
Isuzu Trooper - SUV
Isuzu NPR - lorry
Isuzu LT132 / LT133 / LT134 - bus
Iveco Daily - van
Kia Cerato - unmarked car
Kia Cerato

Land Rover Defender 90 / 110 / three-axle - patrol SUV
Land Rover Discovery - patrol SUV
Lexus CT200h - patrol car
MAN 13.220 HOCL/R / China Kong CK1999 bodywork - bus
MAN LE14.224 - truck
Mazda 6 - unmarked
Mercedes-Benz Sprinter 314D - patrol van
Mercedes-Benz Sprinter 518 CDI - patrol van
Mercedes-Benz T2 609D / 711D - PTU van
Mercedes-Benz Vario 814D / 815D (Trooper) - PTU van
Mercedes-Benz SK Series 2527 - truck
Mercedes-Benz Actros 1831 - tractor
Mercedes-Benz Actros anti riot water cannon
Mercedes-Benz Atego - bus
Mercedes-Benz Unimog U5000 Armoured Personnel Carrier
Mitsubishi Super Exceed - mpv
Mitsubishi i MiEV - car
Mitsubishi Pajero - SUV
Mitsubishi Fuso Canter - lorry
Mitsubishi Fuso Rosa - bus
Nissan Tiida Latio- car
Nissan Cefiro - car
Nissan Urvan E24 - van
Nissan Urvan E25 - van
Nissan UD PKC212 - truck
Suzuki Hustler- car
Sinotruk howo - anti riot water cannon
Toyota Alphard (GGH20) 3.5 – unmarked Full-size MPV
Toyota Alphard Hybrid (GGH20) 2.4 Hybrid – unmarked Full-size MPV
Toyota Corolla (E160) – car
Toyota Camry (XV70) – car
Toyota Land Cruiser Prado – SUV
Toyota Prius – car
Toyota Echo Verso – car
Toyota Hiace – van
Toyota Coaster – (SWLB) bus
Vectrix ZEV - variant of Vectrix Maxi-Scooter, electric motorcycle
Volkswagen Caddy - car
Volkswagen Passat - car
Volkswagen Phaeton - car
Volvo S70 - car 
Audi A6 estate – car
Renault Fluence ZE – car

Retired vehicles
Following the Second World War, Hong Kong Police vehicles, with exception of motorcycles were generally painted in "battleship" grey. The livery changed to dark 'navy' blue following the Queen's bestowment of the "Royal"title to the force in recognition of their services during the 1967 Communist disturbances. The Royal Hong Kong Police crest was also displayed on the vehicle. This livery remained standard until the 1990s when white and black/navy blue ; black/navy blue with a white roof  or white with a red stripe and blue pinstripes came into being. 

This is a list of retired vehicles (incomplete):
Alvis Saracen APC - tactical APC (all retired)
Bedford TJ (all retired)
Mitsubishi Galant - car (all retired)
Mitsubishi Lancer  - car (all retired)
BMW R850RT-P - motorbike (all retired and replaced by BMW R900RT-P)
Ford Cortina - car (all retired)
Ford Transit Mk.II - van (all retired)
Ford Falcon - car (all retired)
Ford Granada - car (all retired)
Ford Transit - patrol van (all retired)
Mazda Familia - car (all Retired)
Mazda Capella - car (all Retired)
Mazda 626 and 323 - car (all retired)
Mazda 929 - car (all retired)
Mazda Bongo E2000 - van (all retired)
Morris Mini - car (all retired)
Ford Telstar - car (all retired)
Honda CB750P - motorbike (all retired) 
Isuzu NPR - lorry (all retired)
Isuzu FTR - lorry (all retired)
Landrover Series III - patrol SUV (all retired)
Mercedes-Benz T1 207D/310D (all retired)
Mitsubishi Fuso Bus (BM chassis) - bus (all retired)
Toyota Camry (XV10) - unmarked (all retired)
Toyota Dyna - lorry (all retired)
Leyland DAF – van (all retired)

External links

External links
Police Transport and Vessels

 
Car